The Gwalior Inscription of Mihirakula is a Sanskrit inscription recording the construction of a Surya temple from stone on the Gopa hill of Gwalior. Though now referred with the name of Mihirakula, the temple and the inscription was commissioned by Matricheta. The original temple is lost, and the inscribed red-sandstone slab was found in 1861 by Alexander Cunningham in the porch of another temple, and published in 1861. This inscribed stone from Gwalior was moved shortly after its discovery to the Kolkata museum for preservation. Several translations of it have been published thereafter. It is damaged, its script is the northern class of ancient Gupta script and the entire composition is in poetic verse.

It is notable for mentioning a Sun temple in the first part of the sixth century CE, and the rule of the two Hūṇa kings Toramana and Mihirakula.

Location
Gwalior is located in northern Madhya Pradesh, India. The shrine probably stood on the edge of the tank known as Surāj Kuṇḍ on Gwalior Fort.  The inscription is in the Indian Museum.

Publication
The inscription was found by Cunningham, who published it in 1861. Rajendralala Mitra published its first interpretation and translation in 1862. At this time, nine lines of text were extant on the broken slab. The inscription was damaged, with first 2-3 characters of every line lost. After its discovery, more lines were lost before the slab was removed and shifted to the Imperial Museum at Calcutta (Indian Museum, Kolkata). Now only seven lines can be studied. John Faithfull Fleet published an interpolated version of this inscription, and a translation of the reconstructed inscription in 1888. It was subsequently noted by Bhandarkar, Garde, Dvivedī and Willis in their respective epigraphic lists. An edition was published by D. C. Sircar in his Select Inscriptions.

Description and contents
The inscription is on red sandstone, written in Sanskrit and mostly a poetic verse about god Surya, suggesting it originated in the Saura tradition of Hinduism. The purport is to record that a stone temple was built for the god on the Gopa hill in the month of Kārttika, a hill that is now found in southern part of the Gwalior Fort. The stone temple is now missing. It mentions the name of the sponsor to be Matricheta, the son of Matridasa, was the patron.

It does not mention the year or era, but mentions the 15th year of Mihirakula, giving this inscription a part of its name and making it a significant historical record.

Inscription
Siddham has published the critically edited version of the inscription as:

Translation
John Fleet in 1888 interpolated and translated the surviving portions of the inscription as follows:

See also
Indian inscriptions
Eran boar inscription of Toramana

Notes

External links
British Museum Research Project : Politics, Ritual and Religion : Epigraphic Findspots

Sanskrit inscriptions in India
Gupta and post-Gupta inscriptions